Glory Revealed: The Word of God In Worship (released in 2007) is a compilation album by popular contemporary Christian musicians. It garnered the Gospel Music Association's Special Event Album of the Year award for 2008.

Track listing
Trevor Morgan - "He Will Rejoice"
Steven Curtis Chapman, Brian Littrell, Mac Powell, and Mark Hall - "By His Wounds"
Shawn Lewis (Hyper Static Union) - "Waters Gone By"
David Crowder and Shane & Shane - "To the Only God"
Candi Pearson-Shelton - "Glory Revealed"
Josh Bates - "Altar of God"
Michael W. Smith with Shane & Shane - "Come, Worship the King"
Tim Neufeld (Starfield) - "Who Is Like You"
Mac Powell (Third Day) and Candi Pearson-Shelton - "Restore to Me"
Brian Littrell - "You Alone"

Awards

In 2008, the album won a Dove Award for Special Event Album of the Year at the 39th GMA Dove Awards. Also, the song "By His Wounds" won the award for Inspirational Recorded Song of the Year.

References

External links
Official web site

2007 compilation albums